The Hasselborg Lake East Shelter Cabin was a historic backcountry shelter in the Admiralty Island National Monument, part of Tongass National Forest in Southeast Alaska.  The cabin, of which at best ruins survive today (it was described as being collapsed as long ago as 1985), was a three-sided Adirondack-style log structure, made of peeled logs, and covered with wood shakes.  It was located near the mouth of the stream that drains Beaver Lake into Hasselborg Lake.  The shelter was built in 1936 as part of a Civilian Conservation Corps works project to create a canoe route across the island.

The cabin site was listed on the National Register of Historic Places in 1995.

See also
National Register of Historic Places listings in Hoonah-Angoon Census Area, Alaska

References

1936 establishments in Alaska
Buildings and structures completed in 1936
Civilian Conservation Corps in Alaska
Log cabins in the United States
Buildings and structures on the National Register of Historic Places in Hoonah–Angoon Census Area, Alaska
Park buildings and structures on the National Register of Historic Places in Alaska
Tongass National Forest
Log buildings and structures on the National Register of Historic Places in Alaska